Gaelic Games: Football is a video game developed by IR Gurus and published by Sony Computer Entertainment. The game was released on 11 November 2005. It is based on Gaelic football and was developed by an Australian company that (at the time) made the AFL video game series.  No player names are featured.

Gaelic Games: Football is the first GAA video game to be released on a home console.

Gameplay
The game features the All-Ireland Senior Football Championship and NFL with commentary by Mícheál Ó Muircheartaigh.

Critical reception
Despite being commercially successful, Gaelic Games: Football received poor reviews from critics and fans who claimed it was nowhere near the standard of gameplay with games like PES and FIFA 06 had produced.

Sequel
A follow up game, Gaelic Games: Football 2, was released in November 2007. It was given very poor reviews by critics due to little improvement from the first.

References

2005 video games
Europe-exclusive video games
Gaelic games video games
PlayStation 2 games
PlayStation 2-only games
EyeToy games
Video games developed in Australia
Video games set in Ireland
Multiplayer and single-player video games
Sony Interactive Entertainment games
Transmission Games games